Chet Anekwe  is an actor and filmmaker who was born in Nigeria and raised in New York City. His work spans Hollywood, Nollywood and the New York Theater.

Filmography

Awards and nominations

Other awards 
1997 AUDELCO award nominee, Best Performance in a Musical, Male for Chap Am So (The Amistad Story)
2006 'VIV' AUDELCO Award Winner Best Ensemble for Real Black Men Don't Sit Crossed Legged on the Floor (Collage in blues)
2011 Nollywood and African Film Critics Awards (NAFCA) Winner: Best Actor in a Supporting Role – Diaspora, Paparazzi
2012 Nollywood Film Critics Award (NAFCA) Winner: Best Actor – Diaspora, Unwanted Guest
2014 Nollywood & African Film Critics' Awards (NAFCA) award nominee, Best Actor in Supporting role Diaspora Film (When One Door Closes)

See also
 List of Nigerian film producers
 List of Nigerian actors
 List of Nigerian Americans

References

External links

 

Nigerian film directors
Nigerian male film actors
Nigerian screenwriters
Living people
Male actors from Lagos
Nigerian expatriate male actors in the United States
21st-century Nigerian male actors
Nigerian male stage actors
Year of birth missing (living people)
American people of Nigerian descent
People from New York (state)
Nigerian film producers